The George A. Marsh was a three-masted schooner built in Michigan City Indiana  in 1882 as a lumber carrier. In 1914, the Marsh was sold to a Belleville, Ontario man as a coal carrier.

The Marsh met her demise on August 8, 1917, when she sank during a storm, with a loss of twelve of the fourteen crew (and including seven children between the ages of one and thirteen).

Many wrecks explored by Save Ontario Shipwrecks are not fully intact, unlike the George A. Marsh (1882) a three masted schooner, which sank on August 8, 1917, during a summer gale off Amherst Island near Kingston, Ontario The wreck of the Marsh rests upright and very intact in Lake Ontario, in roughly 80 feet of water.

See also
Marysburgh vortex

External links
Diving information from Geodiving
SOS Dive guide Save Ontario Shipwrecks
Dive information from AdventureDives
Diving information and video from Northern Tech Divers

References

1882 ships
Individual sailing vessels
Lumber schooners
Maritime incidents in 1917
Ships built in Indiana
Shipwrecks of Lake Ontario
Three-masted ships
Wreck diving sites